The 1st Army Aviation Support Regiment "Idra" is an Italian Army unit based at the "Oscar Savini" Airfield in Manziana in Lazio. The regiment is part of the Italian Army's army aviation and assigned to the Army Aviation Support Brigade. The regiment provides 2nd-line maintenance, upgrade and test services for the A109 and AB206 helicopters, which are in service with the Army Aviation Training Center at Viterbo Airport, and for the AB 205A, AB 212, and AB 412 helicopters, which are in service the 2nd Army Aviation Regiment "Sirio", 4th Army Aviation Regiment "Altair", and 3rd Special Operations Helicopter Regiment "Aldebaran".

History 
The Army Light Aircraft Repairs Unit was formed in 1953 at the Artillery Aerial Observation Training Center in Bracciano. In 1957 the center was renamed Army Light Aviation Training Center and moved from Bracciano to Viterbo. On 1 July 1958 the unit was renamed 1st Army Light Aviation Repairs Unit. The unit consisted of a command, a command squadron, a supply section, an inspection and recovery section, an aircraft maintenance and repair section, a helicopter maintenance and repair section, and a subsystems repair section. The unit provided technical-logistical services for all of the army's flying units in central and southern Italy, including the islands of Sicily and Sardinia. The unit also served as the central depot for all of the army's aviation units.

On 12 December 1989 the unit was granted its own flag by the President of the Italian Republic Francesco Cossiga. In 1990 the unit consisted of a command, an administration office, an aviation materiel office, a general services department, a technical department, and aircraft squadron. On 2 June 1993 the unit was renamed 1st Army Aviation Repairs Unit. On 1 September 1996 the unit was renamed 1st Army Aviation Support Regiment "Idra". In 2012 the regiment was assigned to the Army Aviation Support Command, which on 31 July 2019 was renamed Army Aviation Support Brigade.

Naming 
Since the 1975 army reform Italian Army aviation units are named for celestial objects: support regiments are numbered with a single digit and named for one of the 88 modern constellations. The 1st Army Aviation Support Regiment was named for Hydra the largest of the 88 modern constellations. As the regiment was founded in the city of Bracciano the regiment's coats of arms fourth quarter depicts Bracciano's coat of arms.

Current Structure 
As of 2022 the 1st Army Aviation Support Regiment "Idra" consists of:

  1st Army Aviation Support Regiment "Idra", at "Oscar Savini" Airfield
 Headquarters Unit
 Command and Logistic Support Squadron
 Maintenance Unit
 1st Repair Squadron
 2nd Repair Squadron
 3rd Repair Squadron
 Technical and Test Section
 Air-materiel Supply Section
 External Work Section
 Flight Squadron (AB206 helicopters)

See also 
 Army Aviation

External links
Italian Army Website: 1° Reggimento Sostegno Aviazione dell'Esercito "Idra"

References

Army Aviation Regiments of Italy